Filippo "Pippo" Maniero (born 11 September 1972, in Padua) is an Italian retired association footballer who played as a striker.

Club career
Maniero played for several teams throughout his career, most notably A.C. Milan, Parma, Palermo and Torino.

On 31 August 2005, after having been released on a free transfer consequently to the cancellation of Torino, he signed for Rangers, the last day of the transfer window at the start of the 2005–06 season. However he left the club after two months having not made any appearances. He later joined Nuova Piovese, a Venetian team of Eccellenza league, leading it to Serie D promotion. In July 2006 he left Nuova Piovese for Legnarese, a small Prima Categoria (8th division) team in which he started his playing career, where he spent the 2006–07 season.

References

External links
Career profile @ FootballPlus.com

1972 births
Living people
Sportspeople from Padua
Italian footballers
Italy under-21 international footballers
Association football forwards
Serie A players
Serie B players
Ascoli Calcio 1898 F.C. players
Atalanta B.C. players
A.C. Milan players
Calcio Padova players
Palermo F.C. players
Parma Calcio 1913 players
Rangers F.C. players
U.C. Sampdoria players
Torino F.C. players
Venezia F.C. players
Brescia Calcio players
Footballers from Veneto